Elections for East Lothian Council took place in May 1977, alongside elections to the councils of Scotland's various other districts.

Ward Results

Labour
 Musselburgh 1
 Musselburgh 2
 Musselburgh 3
 Tranent 
 Ormiston
 Inveresk
 Prestonpans 
 Preston 
 Gladsmuir

Conservative
 Musselburgh 4
 Cockenzie
 Haddington
 Lammermuir
 Dirleton
 Dunbar
 East Linton
 North Berwick

References

1977
1977 Scottish local elections